James Arellanes (born January 30, 1974) is a former professional American football player who was a quarterback in the NFL Europe League (NFLEL), the Arena Football League (AFL), and the XFL. He played for the Rhein Fire of the NFLEL, the Carolina Cobras and Florida Bobcats of the AFL, and the Orlando Rage of the XFL. Arellanes played collegiately at Los Angeles Valley College before transferring to Fresno State.

Professional career
Arellanes was signed as an undrafted free agent by the Seattle Seahawks following the 1997 NFL Draft. After spending training camp with the team, he was released during the preseason on August 16. Later that year, he was signed to the Seahawks' practice squad. Following the 1997 season, Arellanes was allocated to the Rhein Fire of NFL Europe, where he was the back-up to Mike Quinn. Rhein finished the regular season in second place with a record of 7–3 and qualified for the championship game, World Bowl '98. Due to an injury to Quinn, Arellanes started the game and led the Rhein Fire to a 34–10 victory over the Frankfurt Galaxy, the first championship in team history. He completed 12 of 18 passes for 263 yards with three touchdowns and no interceptions, a performance which earned him Most Valuable Player honors.

References

American football quarterbacks
1974 births
Living people
People from Pico Rivera, California
Players of American football from California
Sportspeople from Los Angeles County, California
Los Angeles Valley Monarchs football players
Carolina Cobras players
Fresno State Bulldogs football players
Florida Bobcats players
Orlando Rage players
Rhein Fire players
World Bowl MVPs